Was It Something I Said? is the third album recorded by singer-songwriter Eytan Mirsky, released in 2001.

Track listing
 "When Good Girls Go Bad"
 "Love Is for Girls"
 "Just Another in a Long Long Line"
 "Can't Make Up My Mind"
 "Leaving You"
 "Can I Get Any Lower?"
 "Do I Have to Say It?"
 "Meet Some Girls"
 "Only Hurting Myself"
 "All the Things to Do When She Says No"
 "Sluts!"
 "When You're a Human Being"
 "Payback"
 "You Don't Know Her"

Bonus tracks

2001 albums